Uganda competed at the 1996 Summer Olympics in Atlanta, United States.

Medalists

Athletics

Men
Track & road events

Women
Track & road events

Boxing

Men

Table tennis

Singles

Doubles

Weightlifting

Men

See also
 Uganda at the 1996 Summer Paralympics

References
Official Olympic Reports
International Olympic Committee results database
sports-reference

Nations at the 1996 Summer Olympics
1996
1996 in Ugandan sport